Presidential elections were held in Madagascar on 25 November 1992, with a run-off between the top two contenders on 10 February 1993. Incumbent President Didier Ratsiraka of AREMA lost the election to Albert Zafy, leader of the National Union for Development and Democracy in the second round after neither candidate reached 50% in the first round.

Voter turnout was 74.43% for the first round and 68.49% for the second.

Results

References

Presidential elections in Madagascar
1992 in Madagascar
1993 in Madagascar
Madagascar
Madagascar
November 1992 events in Africa
February 1993 events in Africa